Since Kentucky became a U.S. state in 1792, it has sent congressional delegations to the United States Senate and United States House of Representatives. Each state elects two senators to serve for six years, and members of the House to two-year terms.

These are tables of congressional delegations from Kentucky to the United States Senate and the United States House of Representatives.

Current delegation 

Kentucky's current congressional delegation in the  consists of its two senators, both of whom are Republicans, and its six representatives: five Republicans and one Democrat.

United States Senate

U.S. House of Representatives

1792–1803: 2 seats 
Following statehood on June 1, 1792, Kentucky had two seats in the House.

1803–1813: 6 seats
Following the 1800 census, Kentucky was apportioned 6 seats.

1813–1823: 10 seats
Following the 1810 census, Kentucky was apportioned 10 seats.

1823–1833: 12 seats
Following the 1820 census, Kentucky was apportioned 12 seats.

1833–1843: 13 seats
Following the 1830 census, Kentucky was apportioned 13 seats.

1843–1863: 10 seats
Following the 1840 census, Kentucky was apportioned 10 seats.

1863–1873: 9 seats
Following the 1860 census, Kentucky was apportioned 9 seats.

1873–1883: 10 seats
Following the 1870 census, Kentucky was apportioned 10 seats.

1883–1933: 11 seats
Following the 1880 census, Kentucky was apportioned 11 seats.

1933–1953: 9 seats
Following the 1930 census, Kentucky was apportioned 9 seats, all of which were elected at-large statewide for the 73rd Congress, after which it redistricted into 9 districts.

1953–1963: 8 seats
Following the 1950 census, Kentucky was apportioned 8 seats.

1963–1993: 7 seats
Following the 1960 census, Kentucky was apportioned 7 seats.

1993–present: 6 seats
Following the 1990 census, Kentucky was apportioned 6 seats.

Key

See also

 List of United States congressional districts
 Kentucky's congressional districts
Political party strength in Kentucky

References

 
 
Kentucky
Politics of Kentucky
Congressional delegations